John E. Carisi (February 23, 1922 – October 3, 1992) was an American trumpeter and composer.

Early life and career
Carisi was born in Hasbrouck Heights, New Jersey on February 22, 1922, the youngest of three children born to John G. and Philomena Carisi. Raised in Jamaica, Queens, Carisi attended Jamaica High School, where he taught himself trumpet while playing in dance bands in 1937.

Early in his career, Carisi was a member of Herbie Fields's Orchestra (1938–1943) and Glenn Miller's 'Army Air Force Band'. After the war he worked with Ray McKinley, Claude Thornhill, Charlie Barnet, Urbie Green, and Benny Goodman, among others and studied with acclaimed composer Stefan Wolpe.

His minor-blues composition "Israel" was quickly recognized as a unique jazz classic, after it was recorded by Miles Davis at the sessions which later became known as the Birth of the Cool. Other notable versions have been recorded by Bill Evans, and the Gerry Mulligan Concert Jazz Band. Another well known  Carisi piece, "Springsville", was recorded by Miles Davis, as arranged by Gil Evans on the album, Miles Ahead.

In 1957, he arranged the music for Urbie Green's album, All About Urbie Green. He shared an album with Cecil Taylor that was released as Into the Hot under Gil Evans' name for Impulse! in 1961, and arranged Marvin Stamm's 1968 album Machinations.

Carisi also taught, at Queens College and later at Manhattan School of Music.

On October 3, 1992, at the age of 70, Carisi died in New York as a result of complications stemming from open heart surgery undergone in February of that year.

Selected discography
 Urbie Green: All About Urbie Green and His Big Band (ABC-Paramount, 1956)
 Miles Davis & Gil Evans Orchestra: Miles Ahead (Columbia, 1957)
 Gil Evans: Gil Evans & Ten (Prestige, 1957)
 John Carisi: The New Jazz Sound of Showboat (Columbia, 1960)
 Gil Evans: Into the Hot (Impulse! Records; 1961)
 Marvin Stamm: Machinations (Verve, 1968)
 John Carisi, Eddie Sauter, Christian Wolff, Stefan Wolpe: Counterpoise (hat(now)ART; 2000)

References

Literature
 Hentoff, Nat: Liner Notes to Into The Hot (Impulse!, 1961)
 Morton, Richard & Cook, Brian: The Penguin Guide To Jazz on CD, Second Edition, 1994 & Sixth Edition, London, Penguin, 2002

External links

 Verve on Carisi
 Relationship to Wolpe
New York Sun (2007)

American jazz trumpeters
American male trumpeters
American male composers
1922 births
1992 deaths
20th-century American composers
20th-century trumpeters
20th-century American male musicians
American male jazz musicians
Jamaica High School (New York City) alumni
Manhattan School of Music faculty
Musicians from Queens, New York
People from Jamaica, Queens
Queens College, City University of New York faculty
United States Army Air Forces personnel of World War II